Tenatumomab is a monoclonal antibody designed for the treatment of cancer.

References 

Monoclonal antibodies